Răzvan Sabău (born 18 June 1977) is a Romanian retired professional tennis player. He reached the semifinals of Bucharest in 2003 and Gstaad in 2005, achieving a career-high singles ranking of World No. 74 in September 2005. He is the coach of Patricia Maria Țig.

Tennis career

Juniors
Born in Bucharest, Romania, Sabău trained at the Nick Bollettieri Tennis Academy in his junior years and in 1993 he won the Wimbledon junior singles title, finishing the year as the No. 2 junior in the world. He ranked No. 1 for four months that year.

Pro tour
Sabău turned pro in 1993, at age 16, and the next year he reached the doubles semifinals of the Bucharest Open (with Andrei Pavel)

Sabău made his Davis Cup debut in 1994, when he posted his first two wins, against Jeremy Bates and Mark Petchey of Great Britain.

When he made his first appearance at a Grand Slam tournament, at Roland Garros in 1999, he lost in the first round.

After a series of injuries between 2000 and 2002, he had to start from the bottom of the ATP rankings, and played mostly in Challenger Series tournaments. Sabău won three Challenger titles in his career: Homestead in 2004, Košice and Budapest in 2005.

His biggest achievements in the ATP Tour are reaching the semifinals twice, at the Bucharest Open in 2003, where he lost to Nicolás Massú and at Gstaad in 2005, where he lost to Stanislas Wawrinka.

Sabău got his best ATP Singles Ranking in September 2005, reaching World No. 74. Later that year, he played for the first time at the US Open, but lost in the first round to Andre Agassi.

In 2006, he made his first appearance at the Australian Open and Wimbledon, and his second at the French Open but failed to advance past the first round in any of the three.

2007, by contrast, was a poor year for Sabău.  Playing the ATP Challenger Series, he did not advance beyond the second round in singles in any events, losing in the first round fourteen out of eighteen times.  In seven tournaments in doubles, he only advanced beyond the first round once.

His poor results the previous year meant Sabău was relegated to the ITF Men's Circuit for 2008.  He captured one title, Romania F1 Futures tournament, and reached two other finals.  His ranking rose from World No. 630 at the end of 2007 to No. 460 by the end of 2008.

Sabău played far fewer events in 2009 – twenty compared with thirty-one in 2008.  He reached two Futures finals but failed to win a single main draw match at Challenger level, in four events played. (The previous year he won just one Challenger main draw match in ten tournaments entered.) Sabău finished 2009 ranked World No. 627 in singles.  For the second year in a row he competed in just two tour doubles events, both Futures, reaching the semi-finals in one.

Sabău competed in sixteen events in 2010, all in Romania, Italy, and France, and all but three ITF Futures.  He reached one final and four semi-finals, and won a Challenger main draw match for the first time in two seasons.  His ranking climbed a hundred spots, to finish the year World No. 527.

Sabău was busier in 2011, competing by early June in more events than he had in all the previous year.  All but one were Futures tournaments.  He won one title, Bulgaria F3, and lost in the first round just once. His singles ranking climbed to be in the middle 400s.

Junior Grand Slam finals

Singles: 1 (1 title)

ATP Challenger and ITF Futures finals

Singles: 25 (9–16)

Doubles: 2 (0–2)

Performance timelines

Singles

References

External links

1977 births
Living people
Sportspeople from Bradenton, Florida
Tennis players from Bucharest
Romanian expatriate sportspeople in the United States
Romanian male tennis players
Wimbledon junior champions
Grand Slam (tennis) champions in boys' singles